Coast Chilcotin was a federal electoral district represented in the House of Commons of Canada from 1968 to 1979. It was located in the province of British Columbia.

Geography 
The riding spanned the southern Coast Mountains and included the Central Coast through Queen Charlotte Strait and Johnstone Strait to the Sunshine Coast and Howe Sound, as well as the Chilcotin Plateau and from the Cariboo down to Howe Sound via Lillooet.

History 
Coast Chilcotin was created in 1966 and incorporated components of these other ridings:

Cariboo
Coast—Capilano
Comox—Alberni
Fraser Valley
Kamloops
Skeena

The most significant components were those from Comox—Alberni (the Sunshine Coast), Cariboo and Coast—Capilano.  Coast Chilcotin was first used in the Canadian federal election of 1968. It was abolished in 1976 when it was redistributed between:
Cariboo—Chilcotin
Comox—Powell River
Capilano

Members of Parliament

Election results

See also 

 List of Canadian federal electoral districts
 Past Canadian electoral districts

References 

Elections Canada webpage on Coast Chilcotin

External links 
Riding history from the Library of Parliament

Former federal electoral districts of British Columbia